The Leyenda de Plata (2007) was professional wrestling tournament produced by the Mexican wrestling promotion Consejo Mundial de Lucha Libre (CMLLl; Spanish "World Wrestling Council") that ran from May 18, 2007, over the course of four of CMLL's Friday night shows in Arena México with the finals on June 8, 2007. The annual Leyenda de Plata tournament is held in honor of lucha libre legend El Santo and is one of CMLL's most important annual tournaments. This was the first year that Leyenda de Plata was held without El Hijo del Santo working for CMLL, CMLL claimed that they owned the rights to promote the Leyenda de Plata and has promoted it without Hijo del Santo working for CMLL since then.

The first torneo cibernetico elimination match took place on May 18, Perro Aguayo Jr. was originally scheduled to be part of the match, hinting at a very anticipated Aguayo vs. Místico match that had been building for a while. In the weeks leading up to the first cibernetico Perro Aguayo Jr. was injured and had to pull out of the match, he was replaced by fellow Los Perros del Mal member Mr. Águila, who'd go on to win the qualifier over Negro Casas, El Felino, Tarzan Boy, Mephisto, Máximo, Alex Koslov, Stuka Jr., Volador Jr. and Mictlán. On May 25, 2007 El Sagrado qualified for his first ever Leyenda semi-final as he outlasted Averno, Ephesto, Virus, El Texano Jr., Leono, Loco Max, Valiente, Heavy Metal and Black Warrior. On June 1, 2007 Mr. Águila defeated El Sagrado to earn a spot in the final. On June 8, 2007 Místico became the first wrestler to not only win the tournament twice but also in back to back years as he defeated Mr. Águila. Following his victory Perro Aguayo Jr. attacked Místico furthering the storyline between the top tecnico and top rudo of the promotion.

Production

Background
The Leyenda de Plata (Spanish for "the Silver Legend") is an annual lucha libre tournament scripted and promoted by the Mexican professional wrestling promotion Consejo Mundial de Lucha Libre (CMLL).  The first Leyenda de Plata was held in 1998 and was in honor of El Santo, nicknamed Enmáscarado de Plata (the Silver mask) from which the tournament got its name. The trophy given to the winner is a plaque with a metal replica of the mask that El Santo wore in both wrestling and lucha films.

The Leyenda de Plata was held annually until 2003, at which point El Santo's son, El Hijo del Santo left CMLL on bad terms. The tournament returned in 2004 and has been held on an almost annual basis since then. The original format of the tournament was the Torneo cibernetico elimination match to qualify for a semi-final. The winner of the semi-final would face the winner of the previous year's tournament in the final. Since 2005 CMLL has held two cibernetico matches and the winner of each then meet in the semi-final. In 2011, the tournament was modified to eliminate the final stage as the previous winner, Místico, did not work for CMLL at that point in time The 2007 edition of La Leyenda de Plata was the ninth overall tournament held by CMLL.

Storylines
The events featured a total of number of professional wrestling matches with different wrestlers involved in pre-existing scripted feuds, plots and storylines. Wrestlers were portrayed as either heels (referred to as rudos in Mexico, those that portray the "bad guys") or faces (técnicos in Mexico, the "good guy" characters) as they followed a series of tension-building events, which culminated in a wrestling match or series of matches.

Tournament overview

Cibernetico 1

Cibernetico 2

Results

May 18, 2007

May 25, 2007

June 1, 2007

June 8, 2007

References

2007 in professional wrestling
Leyenda de Plata
Events in Mexico City
June 2007 events in Mexico